Zátor is a municipality and village in Bruntál District in the Moravian-Silesian Region of the Czech Republic. It has about 1,200 inhabitants.

Administrative parts
The village of Loučky is an administrative part of Zátor.

Notable people
Johann Rudolf Kutschker (1810–1881), Austrian cardinal

References

Villages in Bruntál District